The 2020–21 EHF Champions League was the 61st edition of Europe's premier club handball tournament and the 28th edition under the current EHF Champions League format.

Due to the COVID-19 pandemic, each local health department dictated the number of spectators allowed at a given match.

Barça defeated Aalborg Håndbold, 36–23, to win their tenth title.

Format
The competition begins with a group stage featuring 16 teams divided in two groups. Matches are played in a double round-robin system with home-and-away fixtures. In Groups A and B, originally the top two teams qualify for the quarterfinals, with teams ranked 3rd to 6th entering the playoffs. After a decision by the EHF, all teams advanced.

The knockout stage included four rounds: the round of 16, quarterfinals, and a final-four tournament comprising two semifinals and the final. The teams were paired against each other in two-legged home-and-away matches, with the aggregate winners qualifying to the next round. 

In the final four tournament, the semifinals and the final were played as single matches at a pre-selected host venue.

Teams

A total of 24 teams from 16 countries submitted their application for a place in the competition's group stage before the deadline of 10 June 2020. The final list of 16 participants was revealed by the EHF Executive Committee on 19 June. Ten teams were registered according to fixed places, while six were granted wild cards.

Group stage

The draw was held on 1 July 2020 at the EHF headquarters in Vienna, Austria. The 16 teams were drawn into two groups of eight, with the restriction that teams from the same national association could not be drawn into the same group.

In each group, teams play against each other in a double round-robin format, with home and away matches. After completion of the group stage matches, the top two teams from each group would have qualified directly for the quarterfinals, and the four teams ranked 3rd–6th advance to the playoffs, but on 10 February 2021, it was announced that all 16 teams advance from the group stage.

Matches were played on Wednesdays and Thursdays, with starting times at 18:45 and 20:45 (CET/CEST).

Tiebreakers
In the group stage, teams are ranked according to points (2 points for a win, 1 point for a draw, 0 points for a loss). After completion of the group stage, if two or more teams have scored the same number of points, the ranking will be determined as follows:

Highest number of points in matches between the teams directly involved;
Superior goal difference in matches between the teams directly involved;
Highest number of goals scored in matches between the teams directly involved (or in the away match in case of a two-team tie);
Superior goal difference in all matches of the group;
Highest number of plus goals in all matches of the group;
If the ranking of one of these teams is determined, the above criteria are consecutively followed until the ranking of all teams is determined. If no ranking can be determined, a decision shall be obtained by EHF through drawing of lots.

During the group stage, only criteria 4–5 apply to determine the provisional ranking of teams.

Group A

Group B

Note
All matches ending with a 10–0 (or 5–5) results were assessed by the EHF.

Knockout stage

Originally, the top six teams advanced but on 10 February 2021, after a decision by the EHF Executive Committee, it was announced that all 16 teams advance from the group stage.

Play-offs

Quarterfinals

Final four

Final

Statistics and awards

Top goalscorers

Awards
The all-star team was announced on 11 June 2021.

References

External links
Official website

 
2020
2020 in handball
2021 in handball
2020 in European sport
2021 in European sport